Gheorghe Lichiardopol (2 August 1913 – 1991) was a Romanian sport shooter who competed in the 1952 Summer Olympics and at the 1956 Summer Olympics, winning two bronze medals.

References

1913 births
1991 deaths
Romanian male sport shooters
Romanian people of Greek descent
ISSF pistol shooters
Olympic shooters of Romania
Shooters at the 1952 Summer Olympics
Shooters at the 1956 Summer Olympics
Olympic bronze medalists for Romania
Olympic medalists in shooting
Medalists at the 1952 Summer Olympics
Medalists at the 1956 Summer Olympics
Sportspeople from Bucharest
20th-century Romanian people